Cameron Hughes is a Canadian crowd igniter, professional speaker and sports entertainer. .

Cameron is paid by sports teams to attend their games and energize fans. The only professional sports entertainer of his kind in the world, Cameron has performed at over 1,500 events including 2 Olympic Games, 5 NBA Finals, 3 Stanley Cup Finals, the US Open tennis tournament including the  2011 US Open, where Cameron inspired former world #1 tennis player Novak Djokovic to dance on court after his match.  

Cameron and Novak also got together for an impromptu dance at center court at the US Open in 2015. Commentator Brad Gilbert was interviewing Novak after his match when he asked about the "wild dancer."  Novak brought Cameron onto the court for fun dancing and t-shirt twirling. Novak won the US OPEN in both of those years: 2011 &  2015. 

As a result of being recognized at the US Open, Cameron performed at Match for Africa,  Roger Federer's charity event in Seattle and San Jose. Roger Federer teamed up with Bill Gates and played exhibition matches before playing with John Isner and Jack Sock. He was asked to perform at the Laver Cup in London, UK, in September 2022, which was Roger Federer's last match. His clips from the US OPEN, MFA, and LC have been seen by hundreds of millions worldwide.  

He has performed for the NFL, NCAA, NBA and Rugby 7s (Canada, Singapore). He has performed in over 180 minor league arenas and stadiums, including the ECHL, AHL, CHL, UHL, NLL, and C, EIHL, IFL. 

Cameron published his first book on November 10, 2020. King of Cheer - Stories of Showing Up, Getting Up, and Never Giving Up from the world's most electrifying crowd Ignitor. His first book signing was in Las Vegas through the Vegas Golden Knights. 

Cameron has done commercials for many companies including DirecTV, and Findlay Chevrolet, a Las Vegas-based car dealership. He was also the voice of the Labatt Radio Blue Campaign. 

In Cameron’s own words, "I hope my story will inspire you to cheer a little louder, smile a little wider, dance a little crazier, contribute to your team, be fearless, and most importantly, to GET UP and become your own biggest fan. I’m thrilled to take you on my journey and show you the true power of cheer."

Public  Speaking 

Cameron started speaking at high schools across Canada with the "GET INVOLVED" program and then began doing leadership talks for Universities and colleges, and is now a well respected Keynote speaker for fortune 500 companies from Indeed, Coca-Cola, Caesars Entertainment, Virgin Hotels, Uberflip, Venetian Hotels, American Gem Society, Real Estate conferences and hosts many special events. His fame on stage came from being relatable, emotional, and high energy. He's well known for using elaborate crowd techniques to keep them engaged.

Early Life and Education

Cameron was born in Ottawa, Canada. He attended RPPS in Ottawa with the pre-eminent ambassador and political children, including Canadian Prime Minister Justin Trudeau. He attended Lisgar Collegiate, graduating and serving as class president in 1990. Cameron went to Bishop's University in Lennoxville, Quebec. He studied Sociology. He hosted an Alumni event in the fall of 2022, where he was called, the " Most Viral" Graduate of all-time.

References

External links
Official website

Malcolm and the Power of Cheer
Working with Katie Couric to Inspire Communities Across America
Performing at 2022 Laver Cup
Cameron Hughes dancing with Novak Djokovic at center court

Year of birth missing (living people)
Living people
Sports spectators
Bishop's University alumni